Sovannahong  (en. Golden Phoenix) is a 1967 Cambodian film directed by Yvon Hem and based on Khmer mythology about the first Khmer creation of a giant phoenix made from gold which similar to the plane nowadays. It is one of the most successful local fantasy films in the 1960s.

Soundtrack

Cast
Saom Vansodany
Kong Som Eun
Or Po
Or Dom
Mae Meun
Mandoline

Cambodian fantasy films
Khmer-language films
1967 films